Harry Morey Callahan (October 22, 1912 – March 15, 1999) was an American photographer and educator. He taught at both the Institute of Design in Chicago and the Rhode Island School of Design.

Callahan's first solo exhibition was at the Art Institute of Chicago in 1951. He had a retrospective at the Museum of Modern Art in New York in 1976/1977. Callahan was a recipient of the Edward MacDowell Medal and the National Medal of Arts. He represented the United States in the Venice Biennale in 1978.

Early life
Harry Morey Callahan was born in Detroit, Michigan. He worked at Chrysler when he was a young man then left the company to study engineering at Michigan State University. He dropped out, returned to Chrysler and joined its camera club. Callahan began teaching himself photography in 1938. He formed a friendship with Todd Webb who was also to become a photographer. A talk given by Ansel Adams in 1941 inspired him to take his work seriously. In 1941, Callahan and Webb visited Rocky Mountain State Park but didn't return with any photographs. In 1946 he was invited to teach photography at the Institute of Design in Chicago by László Moholy-Nagy. He moved to Rhode Island in 1961 to establish a photography program at the Rhode Island School of Design, eventually inviting close friend and fellow artist Aaron Siskind to join him, teaching there until his retirement in 1977.

Career
Callahan left almost no written records—no diaries, letters, scrapbooks or teaching notes. His technical photographic method was to go out almost every morning, walk through the city he lived in and take numerous pictures. He then spent almost every afternoon making proof prints of that day's best negatives. Yet, for all his photographic activity, Callahan, at his own estimation, produced no more than half a dozen final images a year.

He photographed his wife and daughter and the streets, scenes and buildings of cities where he lived, showing a strong sense of line and form, and light and darkness. Even prior to birth, his daughter showed up in photographs of Eleanor's pregnancy. From 1948 to 1953 Eleanor, and sometimes Barbara, were shown out in the landscape as a tiny counterpoint to large expanses of park, skyline or water.

He also worked with multiple exposures. Callahan's work was a deeply personal response to his own life. He encouraged his students to turn their cameras on their own lives, leading by example. Callahan photographed his wife over a period of fifteen years, as his prime subject. Eleanor was essential to his art from 1947 to 1960. He photographed her everywhere—at home, in the city streets, in the landscape; alone, with their daughter, in black and white and in color, nude and clothed, distant and close. He tried several technical experiments—double and triple exposure, blurs, large and small format film.

Callahan was one of the few innovators of modern American photography noted as much for his work in color as for his work in black and white. In 1955 Edward Steichen included his work in The Family of Man, MoMA's popular international touring exhibition.

In 1956, he received the Graham Foundation Award, which allowed him to spend a year in France with his family from 1957 to 1958. He settled in Aix-en-Provence, where he took many photographs.

Along with the painter Richard Diebenkorn, he represented the United States in the Venice Biennale in 1978.

In 1994, he selected 130 original prints with the help of the gallery owner Peter MacGill, and brought them together under the name of French Archives, to offer them to the Maison Européenne de la Photographie in Paris. Some of these images were taken in Aix-en-Provence and in the South of France, and are the subject of a temporary exhibition at the Granet Museum in Aix-en-Provence in 2019.

Callahan left behind 100,000 negatives and over 10,000 proof prints. The Center for Creative Photography at the University of Arizona maintains his photographic archives. In 2013, Vancouver Art Gallery received a gift of almost 600 Callahan photographs from the Larry and Cookie Rossy Family Foundation.

Personal life
Callahan met his future wife, Eleanor Knapp, on a blind date in 1933. At that time she was a secretary at Chrysler Motors in Detroit and he was a clerk. They married three years later. In 1950 their daughter Barbara was born.

Callahan died in Atlanta in 1999. His wife Eleanor died on February 28, 2012, in a hospice in Atlanta at the age of 95.

Publications
Harry Callahan. New York: Museum of Modern Art, 1967. . With an introductory essay by Paul Sherman.
Harry Callahan: Color: 1941–1980. Providence, R.I.: Matrix Publications, 1980. Edited by Robert Tow and Ricker Winsor. . With a foreword by Jonathan Williams and an afterword by A. D. Coleman.
Water's Edge. Lyme, CN: Callaway, 1980. . With an introductory poem by A. R. Ammons and an afterword by Callahan.
Eleanor. New York City: Callaway, 1984. .
Harry Callahan: New Color: Photographs 1978-1987. Kansas City, MO: Hallmark Cards, 1988. . Edited(?) and with text by Keith F. Davis. Exhibition catalogue.
Harry Callahan. Masters of Photography. New York: Aperture, 1999. . With an essay by Jonathan Williams.
Harry Callahan: Retrospective. Heidelberg, Germany: Kehrer, 2013. . With essays by Dirk Luckow, Peter MacGill, Sabine Schnakenberg, and Julian Cox. Exhibition catalogue.
Harry Callahan: Photos. Washington, D.C.: National Gallery of Art, 1996. . With text by Sarah Greenough. Exhibition catalogue.
Seven Collages. Göttingen: Steidl, 2012. . With an essay by Julian Cox.
Harry Callahan: The Street. London: Black Dog, 2016. Curated and edited by Grant Arnold. . Exhibition catalogue.

Awards
1956: Graham Foundation Award
1993: Edward MacDowell Medal, MacDowell Colony, Peterborough, NH.
1996: National Medal of Arts

Solo exhibitions
Art Institute of Chicago, Chicago, IL, 1951
Harry Callahan, Museum of Modern Art, New York, 1976/1977. A retrospective.

Collections
Callahan's work is held in the following permanent collections:
Art Institute of Chicago: 105 works (as of April 2019)
George Eastman Museum: 112 works (as of April 2019)
Museum of Contemporary Photography: 28 works (as of April 2019)
Museum of Modern Art, New York: 243 works (as of April 2019)
Philadelphia Museum of Art: 151 works (as of September 2019)

References

External links
"Harry Callahan", Pace/MacGill Gallery

1912 births
1999 deaths
Artists from Detroit
Illinois Institute of Technology faculty
Rhode Island School of Design faculty
United States National Medal of Arts recipients
20th-century American photographers